Warren Hansen (born 25 August 1970) is an Australian taekwondo practitioner. He competed in the men's 80 kg event at the 2000 Summer Olympics.

References

External links
 

1970 births
Living people
Australian male taekwondo practitioners
Olympic taekwondo practitioners of Australia
Taekwondo practitioners at the 2000 Summer Olympics
Sportspeople from Melbourne